Monique Melsen (born 24 February 1951) is a Luxembourgish singer, best known for her participation in the 1971 Eurovision Song Contest. Melsen is one of only eight native Luxembourgish to have represented the country at Eurovision in 37 years of participation.

Background

As was usual with Luxembourg, Melsen's Eurovision song, "Pomme, pomme, pomme" ("Apple, Apple, Apple"), was chosen internally by broadcaster Télé Luxembourg without having to go through a public or jury selection process. "Pomme, pomme, pomme" went to the 16th Eurovision Song Contest, held on 3 April in Dublin, where it finished in 13th place of 18 entries.

In recent years, Melsen has been a member of Cabarenert, a Luxembourg-based cabaret ensemble.

References

External links 
 Cabarenert website (in Luxembourgish)

20th-century Luxembourgian women singers
Eurovision Song Contest entrants for Luxembourg
Eurovision Song Contest entrants of 1971
People from Ettelbruck
1951 births
Living people